
Gmina Niegosławice is a rural gmina (administrative district) in Żagań County, Lubusz Voivodeship, in western Poland.

Villages
Gmina Niegosławice contains the villages and settlements of Bukowica, Bukowiczka, Dworcowy, Gościeszowice, Jurzyn, Krzywczyce, Międzylesie, Mycielin, Niegosławice, Nowa Bukowica, Nowa Jabłona, Nowy Dwór, Przecław, Pustkowie, Rudziny, Stara Jabłona, Sucha Dolna, Wilczyce, Zagóra and Zimna Brzeźnica.

Neighbouring gminas
Gmina Niegosławice is bordered by the gminas of Bytom Odrzański, Gaworzyce, Nowe Miasteczko, Przemków, Szprotawa and Żukowice.

References

Niegoslawice
Żagań County